The Slovakian Women's Volleyball League is a women's volleyball competition organized by the Slovak Volleyball Federation (Slovenská volejbalová federácia, SVF). It was created in 1992, just after the dissolution of Czechoslovakia.

History
The league was created just after the dissolution of Czechoslovakia, Many teams have participated in the league since, most of them especially from the city of Bratislava, which has two strong teams which dominated the league, Slavia Bratislava first with a total of 18 titles, then in second spot BVK Bratislava with five titles.

After the final rankings two teams will represent the country in the European volleyball competitions.

List of champions

Table by club

References

External links
Slovakian Volleyball Federation
 Slovakian Extraliga. women.volleybox.net 

Slovakia
Volleyball in Slovakia
Slovakia
Sports leagues established in 1992
Professional sports leagues in Slovakia